Toumaï FC is a football (soccer) club from Chad based in N'Djamena.

Achievements
Chad Premier League: 0
Chad Cup: 0
Coupe de Ligue de N'Djaména: 0
Chad Super Cup: 0

Performance in CAF competitions

Managers

2010 - Haroun Sabah 'Maître Toro'

Football clubs in Chad